Ink & Dagger were a hardcore punk band from Philadelphia that was active in the 1990s. The two permanent members throughout the band's career were guitarist Don Devore and vocalist Sean Patrick McCabe. Other members included Ashli State, Terry Yerves, Ryan McLaughlin, Joshua Brown, Jennifer Layne Park, Dave Wagenschutz, Derek Zglenski, and Eric Wareheim. Band members frequently incorporated references to vampires in their music, painted their faces, and played with fake blood. Some members were previously in Crud is a Cult, The Mandela Strike Force and Frail.

On-stage theatrics
On one occasion, the band vomited on Christmas trees on stage. McCabe was also infamous for egging Hare Krishna devotees and throwing yogurt at Earth Crisis.

The band's first Halloween show in New Brunswick, NJ was one their most notorious shows. In the words of Robby Redcheeks, "Trope built a coffin to carry Jenny Jamz [Jennifer Layne Park] out to into the show. The show was PACKED. So we put Jenny in the coffin outside of the show, me and 3 other dudes carried her in pushing through the crowd. People were like 'WHAT THE FUCK IS THAT?!' We were all in Dagger makeup also. We set the coffin down in front of the crowd. Jenny got out wearing a black leather body suit and started reciting the oath she wrote in the Drive This 7”. Reciting, im sorry, more like inciting a riot. She was pushing people and yelling in their faces. I had previously prepared a batch of Dagger blood, (this was actually the first time it was used), a mix of 1 bottle of club soda & 1 red color food dye. We made 4 bottles of it and perched on each side of the band for when Jenny was done. When she reached the end, Dagger had already been building up feedback and noise. She finished, and they started off with the beginning to 'Changeling' (if I remember correctly) . Then BLAM we covered the crowd with blood. And chaos erupted throughout. Needless to say, anyone that was at that show will remember that show forever. Including me."

Influence
An example of their influence can be seen on the record The Fine Art of Original Sin which featured several tracks breaking completely from established norms of post-hardcore, incorporating aspects of techno, or drum and bass music.

Additionally, the influences of past emotional hardcore band Frail can still be heard in the yelps and falsettos on Ink & Dagger's 7"s.

Known members

Sean McCabe – vocals, programming
Don Devore – guitar, programming
Ashli State – bass
Terrance Yerves – drums
Dallas Bratcher - Guitars
Eric Wareheim – bass
Jorge Gonzalez – guitar
David Wagenschutz – drums
Joshua Brown – bass, backing vocals
Ryan McLaughlin – drums
Jennifer Park – additional vocals
Chris Tropea (T-Rope) – lights, roadie
Robby Redcheeks - lights, road manager
Gregg Foreman - bass
Justin O’Hare - guitar
Geoff Rickly - vocals

After the group's demise
In 1999, Ink & Dagger formally announced that they were disbanding. Shortly after recording what was to be the band's final album, singer Sean Patrick McCabe was found dead in a motel room in Indiana in 2000, at age 27. The final and self-titled album was released on Buddyhead Records with a picture of a young Sean in a vampire costume featured in the CD booklet.

Don Devore currently plays in the band Sick Feeling. He has also played in Amazing Baby, The Icarus Line, Lilys and others. 

Joshua Brown went on to play in Lenola and Like A Fox. He currently plays bass in The Midnight Sounds.

Terry Yerves never went on to do anything interesting afterwards.

Microsoft Xbox videogame Amped uses three songs from The Fine Art of Original Sin. In 2005, former drummer Ryan McLaughlin sued Microsoft, claiming that they were used without the band's knowledge. The suit was settled out of court in 2006.

Reunion with Geoff Rickly (2010–2011)
In August 2010, Ink & Dagger headlined the 2010 This Is Hardcore festival. Geoff Rickly of Thursday fame sang for this show. All of Ink & Dagger's profits earned from tickets and merchandise at This Is Hardcore benefited Maks Zielanski, a child diagnosed with cancer. Maks is the son of Ed Zielanski who was a member of Crud Is a Cult and Flagman. Ink & Dagger also played a small number of additional shows in Brooklyn, LA and Philadelphia. Rickly's vocals were generally warmly received as a replacement for McCabe. Jon Reiss of New York Press commented, "The band seemed pretty tight and the choice of Rickly for a singer worked about eighty percent of the time. It's impossible to replace a front man so dynamic as McCabe." Ink & Dagger also toured the UK with Rickly in January 2011.

The brief reunion lead to the creation of a new band called Cut Throat Tactics featuring members of Ink & Dagger, Thursday, and The Dillinger Escape Plan. Cut Throat Tactics will begin work on their debut album once all of the members finish work with their primary bands have finished touring.

Discography
Studio albums
 The Fine Art of Original Sin (1998, Initial)
 Ink & Dagger (2000, Buddyhead)

Compilations
 Drive This Seven Inch Wooden Stake Through My Philadelphia Heart (1997, Initial)

EPs
 Love Is Dead (1996, Happy Days, Six Feet Under (RE))
 Drive This Seven Inch Wooden Stake Through My Philadelphia Heart (1997, Initial)
 Experiments In Nocturnal Sound and Energy (1997, Simba, Revelation)
 Sensation (1999, Music Is My Heroine)

Splits
 Split with The Icarus Line (1999, New American Dream)
 Split with Le Shok (1999, Initial)

Bootlegs
 For All The Fucked-Up Children Of This World We Give You Ink & Dagger (1998, self-released)

Compilation appearances

References

External links

Initial Records Biography

Indie rock musical groups from Pennsylvania
Musical groups from Philadelphia
Musical groups established in 1995